The least tiger (Parantica pumila) is a species of butterfly in the Danainae subfamily. It is found in New Caledonia and Vanuatu.

References

Parantica
Taxonomy articles created by Polbot
Butterflies described in 1859